Cahoots is the fourth studio album by Canadian/American rock group the Band. It was released in 1971 to mixed reviews, and was their last album of original material for four years. The album's front cover was painted by New York artist/illustrator Gilbert Stone, while the back cover features a photograph portrait of the group by Richard Avedon. The album features guest vocals from Van Morrison. Libby Titus, the partner of drummer Levon Helm and mother of their daughter Amy Helm, also contributed uncredited backing vocals to "The River Hymn", the first time a woman appeared on a Band album.

Rolling Stone critic Jon Landau described the mood of the album as being "filled with a 'tinge of extinction.

In 2021, a "50th Anniversary" edition of the album was released containing a remix of the original tracks plus outtakes and a partial concert recording from the Olympia Theatre, Paris in May 1971.

Track listing

Side one

Side two

2000 reissue bonus tracks

Personnel
The Band
Rick Danko – bass, acoustic guitar, vocals
Levon Helm – drums, mandolin, bass, vocals
Garth Hudson – organ, accordion, piano, saxophones
Richard Manuel – piano, drums, marimba, vocals
Robbie Robertson – electric and acoustic guitars, piano

Additional personnel
Allen Toussaint – brass arrangements on "Life Is a Carnival"
Van Morrison – vocals on "4% Pantomime"
Libby Titus - uncredited backing vocals on "The River Hymn"
Mark Harman – engineer

References

1971 albums
Albums produced by Garth Hudson
Albums produced by Levon Helm
Albums produced by Richard Manuel
Albums produced by Rick Danko
Albums produced by Robbie Robertson
Capitol Records albums
The Band albums